The 2022–23 Utah Jazz season is the 49th season for the franchise in the National Basketball Association (NBA). On June 5, 2022, Quin Snyder resigned from his position as head coach of the Utah Jazz after eight seasons with the team. On June 29, 2022, the Utah Jazz hired Will Hardy as their head coach. For the first time since 2017–18 season Rudy Gobert and Donovan Mitchell will not be on the roster as they were traded before the season.

Draft 

The Jazz had no selections in the 2022 draft. They owed their first-round pick to the Memphis Grizzlies.

Roster

Standings

Division

Conference

Game log

Preseason 

|-style="background:#fcc;"
| 1
| October 2
| @ Toronto
| 
| Lauri Markkanen (20)
| Gay, Olynyk (6)
| Jarred Vanderbilt (6)
| Rogers Place17,100
| 0–1
|-style="background:#cfc;
| 2
| October 4
| @ Portland
| 
| Jordan Clarkson (19)
| Jarred Vanderbilt (7)
| Kelly Olynyk (6)
| Moda Center15,197
| 1–1
|-style="background:#fcc;
| 3
| October 11
| San Antonio
| 
| Lauri Markkanen (18)
| Gay, Markkanen (10)
| Butler, Clarkson (7)
| Vivint Arena13,887
| 1–2
|-style="background:#fcc;
| 4
| October 14
| Dallas
| 
| Lauri Markkanen (21)
| Lauri Markkanen (10)
| Conley Jr., Sexton (7)
| Vivint Arena15,713
| 1–3

Regular season

|-style="background:#cfc;
| 1
| October 19
| Denver
| 
| Collin Sexton (20)
| Jarred Vanderbilt (12)
| Mike Conley Jr. (8)
| Vivint Arena18,206
| 1–0
|-style="background:#cfc;
| 2
| October 21
| @ Minnesota
| 
| Jordan Clarkson (29)
| Jarred Vanderbilt (14)
| Mike Conley Jr. (11)
| Target Center17,136
| 2–0
|-style="background:#cfc;
| 3
| October 23
| @ New Orleans
| 
| Lauri Markkanen (31)
| Lauri Markkanen (12)
| Mike Conley Jr. (8)
| Smoothie King Center18,665
| 3–0
|-style="background:#fcc;
| 4
| October 24
| @ Houston
| 
| Jordan Clarkson (17)
| Jarred Vanderbilt (11)
| Mike Conley Jr. (7)
| Toyota Center16,260
| 3–1
|-style="background:#cfc;
| 5
| October 26
| Houston
| 
| Lauri Markkanen (24)
| Lauri Markkanen (9)
| Kelly Olynyk (6)
| Vivint Arena18,206
| 4–1
|-style="background:#fcc"
| 6
| October 28
| @ Denver
| 
| Lauri Markkanen (17)
| Lauri Markkanen (10)
| Mike Conley Jr. (5)
| Ball Arena19,560
| 4–2
|-style="background:#cfc;
| 7
| October 29
| Memphis
| 
| Markkanen, Olynyk (23)
| Lauri Markkanen (9)
| Jarred Vanderbilt (7)
| Vivint Arena18,206
| 5–2
|-style="background:#cfc;
| 8
| October 31
| Memphis
| 
| Lauri Markkanen (31)
| Lauri Markkanen (11)
| Jordan Clarkson (7)
| Vivint Arena18,206
| 6–2

|-style="background:#fcc;
| 9
| November 2
| @ Dallas
| 
| Jordan Clarkson (22)
| Malik Beasley (8)
| Clarkson, Conley Jr. (8)
| American Airlines Center19,877
| 6–3
|-style="background:#cfc;
| 10
| November 4
| @ L.A. Lakers
| 
| Lauri Markkanen (27)
| Lauri Markkanen (13)
| Mike Conley Jr. (10)
| Crypto.com Arena18,997
| 7–3
|-style="background:#cfc;
| 11
| November 6
| @ L.A. Clippers
| 
| Jordan Clarkson (23)
| Lauri Markkanen (9)
| Jordan Clarkson (5)
| Crypto.com Arena16,111
| 8–3
|-style="background:#cfc;
| 12
| November 7
| L.A. Lakers
| 
| Lauri Markkanen (23)
| Walker Kessler (9)
| Mike Conley Jr. (12)
| Vivint Arena18,206
| 9–3
|-style="background:#cfc;
| 13
| November 9
| @ Atlanta
| 
| Lauri Markkanen (32)
| Lauri Markkanen (8)
| Mike Conley Jr. (13)
| State Farm Arena15,845
| 10–3
|-style="background:#fcc;
| 14
| November 12
| @ Washington
| 
| Jordan Clarkson (18)
| Jarred Vanderbilt (8)
| Conley Jr., Horton-Tucker (10)
| Capital One Arena13,673
| 10–4
|-style="background:#fcc;
| 15
| November 13
| @ Philadelphia
| 
| Malik Beasley (18)
| Markkanen, Vanderbilt (10)
| Mike Conley Jr. (8)
| Wells Fargo Center19,761
| 10–5
|- style="background:#fcc;"
| 16
| November 15
| New York
| 
| Kelly Olynyk (27)
| Kelly Olynyk (11)
| Mike Conley Jr. (7)
| Vivint Arena18,206
| 10–6
|-style="background:#cfc;
| 17
| November 18
| Phoenix
| 
| Lauri Markkanen (38)
| Jarred Vanderbilt (11)
| Mike Conley Jr. (10)
| Vivint Arena18,206
| 11–6
|-style="background:#cfc;
| 18
| November 19
| @ Portland
| 
| Malik Beasley (29)
| Lauri Markkanen (10)
| Clarkson, Olynyk, Sexton (4)
| Moda Center19,595
| 12–6
|-style="background:#fcc;
| 19
| November 21
| @ L.A. Clippers
| 
| Jordan Clarkson (26)
| Markkanen, Vanderbilt (10)
| Jarred Vanderbilt (5)
| Crypto.com Arena19,068
| 12–7
|-style="background:#fcc;
| 20
| November 23
| Detroit
| 
| Malik Beasley (29)
| Malik Beasley (11)
| Collin Sexton (12)
| Vivint Arena18,206
| 12–8
|-style="background:#fcc;
| 21
| November 25
| @ Golden State
| 
| Lauri Markkanen (24)
| Jarred Vanderbilt (10)
| Jordan Clarkson (10)
| Chase Center18,064
| 12–9
|-style="background:#fcc;
| 22
| November 26
| @ Phoenix
| 
| Jordan Clarkson (22)
| Lauri Markkanen (10)
| Clarkson, Sexton (5)
| Footprint Center17,071
| 12–10
|-style="background:#fcc;
| 23
| November 28
| Chicago
| 
| Lauri Markkanen (32)
| Lauri Markkanen (9)
| Jordan Clarkson (9)
| Vivint Arena18,206
| 12–11
|-style="background:#cfc;
| 24
| November 30
| L.A. Clippers
| 
| Jordan Clarkson (33)
| Jarred Vanderbilt (12)
| Collin Sexton (6)
| Vivint Arena18,206
| 13–11

|-style="background:#cfc;
| 25
| December 2
| Indiana
| 
| Lauri Markkanen (24)
| Lauri Markkanen (13)
| Talen Horton-Tucker (9)
| Vivint Arena18,206
| 14–11
|-style="background:#fcc;
| 26
| December 3
| Portland
| 
| Jordan Clarkson (24)
| Kelly Olynyk (9)
| Kelly Olynyk (6)
| Vivint Arena18,206
| 14–12
|-style="background:#cfc;
| 27
| December 7
| Golden State
| 
| Jordan Clarkson (22)
| Walker Kessler (12)
| Jordan Clarkson (9)
| Vivint Arena18,206
| 15–12
|-style="background:#fcc;
| 28
| December 9
| Minnesota
| 
| Malik Beasley (23)
| Jarred Vanderbilt (10)
| Mike Conley Jr. (6)
| Vivint Arena18,206
| 15–13
|-style="background:#fcc;
| 29
| December 10
| @ Denver
| 
| Nickeil Alexander-Walker (27)
| Kelly Olynyk (9)
| Horton-Tucker, Vanderbilt (4)
| Ball Arena19,636
| 15–14
|-style="background:#cfc;
| 30
| December 13
| New Orleans
| 
| Malik Beasley (21)
| Walker Kessler (16)
| Alexander-Walker, Conley Jr., Vanderbilt (6)
| Vivint Arena18,206
| 16–14
|-style="background:#cfc;
| 31
| December 15
| New Orleans
| 
| Jordan Clarkson (39)
| Clarkson, Kessler (8)
| Mike Conley Jr. (6)
| Vivint Arena18,206
| 17–14
|-style="background:#fcc;
| 32
| December 17
| @ Milwaukee
| 
| Beasley, Markkanen (18)
| Jarred Vanderbilt (6)
| Nickeil Alexander-Walker (5)
| Fiserv Forum17,587
| 17–15
|-style="background:#fcc;
| 33
| December 19
| @ Cleveland
| 
| Lauri Markkanen (24)
| Kessler, Markkanen, Vanderbilt (6)
| Mike Conley Jr. (9)
| Rocket Mortgage FieldHouse19,432
| 17–16
|-style="background:#cfc;
| 34
| December 20
| @ Detroit
| 
| Lauri Markkanen (38)
| Jarred Vanderbilt (13)
| Mike Conley Jr. (7)
| Little Caesars Arena15,622
| 18–16
|-style="background:#cfc;
| 35
| December 22
| Washington
| 
| Malik Beasley (25)
| Walker Kessler (14)
| Mike Conley Jr. (6)
| Vivint Arena18,206
| 19–16
|-style="background:#fcc;
| 36
| December 26
| @ San Antonio
| 
| Lauri Markkanen (32)
| Lauri Markkanen (12)
| Mike Conley Jr. (6)
| AT&T Center16,351
| 19–17
|-style="background:#fcc;
| 37
| December 28
| @ Golden State
| 
| Lauri Markkanen (29)
| Lauri Markkanen (16)
| Mike Conley Jr. (10)
| Chase Center18,064
| 19–18
|-style="background:#fcc;
| 38
| December 30
| @ Sacramento
| 
| Lauri Markkanen (36)
| Kessler, Vanderbilt (8)
| Jordan Clarkson (9)
| Golden 1 Center17,946
| 19–19
|-style="background:#fcc;
| 39
| December 31
| Miami
| 
| Lauri Markkanen (29)
| Lauri Markkanen (14)
| Mike Conley Jr. (8)
| Vivint Arena18,206
| 19–20

|-style="background:#fcc;
| 40
| January 3 
| Sacramento
|  
| Lauri Markkanen (28)
| Jarred Vanderbilt (9)
| Mike Conley Jr. (7)
| Vivint Arena18,206
| 19–21
|-style="background:#cfc;
| 41
| January 5
| @ Houston
|  
| Lauri Markkanen (49)
| Jarred Vanderbilt (9)
| Mike Conley Jr. (11)
| Toyota Center16,320
| 20–21
|-style="background:#fcc;
| 42
| January 7
| @ Chicago
|  
| Lauri Markkanen (28)
| Jarred Vanderbilt (14)
| Jordan Clarkson (8)
| United Center21,694
| 20–22
|-style="background:#fcc;
| 43
| January 8 
| @ Memphis
|  
| Lauri Markkanen (21)
| Walker Kessler (11)
| Mike Conley Jr. (8)
| FedExForum17,794
| 20–23
|-style="background:#cfc;
| 44
| January 10
| Cleveland
|  
| Jordan Clarkson (32)
| Lauri Markkanen (16)
| Beasley, Clarkson, Conley Jr. (4)
| Vivint Arena18,206
| 21–23
|-style="background:#cfc;
| 45
| January 13
| Orlando
| 
| Lauri Markkanen (28)
| Clarkson, Markkanen (12)
| Collin Sexton (3)
| Vivint Arena18,206
| 22–23
|-style="background:#fcc;
| 46
| January 14
| Philadelphia
| 
| Jordan Clarkson (38)
| Walker Kessler (12)
| Mike Conley Jr. (8)
| Vivint Arena18,202
| 22–24
|-style="background:#cfc;
| 47
| January 16
| @ Minnesota
|  
| Jordan Clarkson (21)
| Walker Kessler (21)
| Mike Conley Jr. (6)
| Target Center16,477
| 23–24
|-style="background:#cfc;
| 48
| January 18
| L.A. Clippers
|  
| Lauri Markkanen (34)
| Lauri Markkanen (12)
| Mike Conley Jr. (9)
| Vivint Arena18,206
| 24–24
|-style="background:#fcc;
| 49
| January 20
| Brooklyn
|  
| Jordan Clarkson (29)
| Lauri Markkanen (11)
| Mike Conley Jr. (9)
| Vivint Arena18,206
| 24–25
|-style="background:#cfc;
| 50
| January 23
| Charlotte
|  
| Lauri Markkanen (25)
| Lauri Markkanen (11)
| Talen Horton-Tucker (6)
| Vivint Arena18,206
| 25–25
|-style="background:#fcc;
| 51
| January 25
| @ Portland
|  
| Lauri Markkanen (24)
| Malik Beasley (6)
| Mike Conley (10)
| Moda Center18,154
| 25–26
|-style="background:#cfc;
| 52 
| January 28
| Dallas
|  
| Lauri Markkanen (29)
| Walker Kessler (11)
| Mike Conley (11)
| Vivint Arena18,206
| 26–26

|-style="background:#cfc;
| 53 
| February 1
| Toronto
| 
| Lauri Markkanen (28)
| Walker Kessler (14)
| Mike Conley Jr. (8) 
| Vivint Arena18,206
| 27–26
|-style="background:#fcc;
| 54
| February 3
| Atlanta
| 
| Lauri Markkanen (25)
| Jarred Vanderbilt (11)
| Mike Conley Jr. (8) 
| Vivint Arena18,206
| 27–27
|-style="background:#fcc;
| 55
| February 6
| Dallas
| 
| Jordan Clarkson (26)
| Walker Kessler (9)
| Mike Conley Jr. (11)
| Vivint Arena18,206
| 27–28
|-style="background:#fcc;
| 56
| February 8
| Minnesota
| 
| Collin Sexton (22)
| Walker Kessler (9)
| Clarkson, Horton-Tucker (6)
| Vivint Arena18,206
| 27–29
|-style="background:#cfc;
| 57
| February 10
| @ Toronto
| 
| Kessler, Markkanen (23)
| Kessler, Markkanen (9)
| Horton-Tucker, Olynyk (8)
| Scotiabank Arena19,800
| 28–29
|-style="background:#fcc;
| 58
| February 11
| @ New York
| 
| Lauri Markkanen (29)
| Walker Kessler (15)
| Talen Horton-Tucker (7)
| Madison Square Garden19,339
| 28–30
|-style="background:#cfc;
| 59
| February 13
| @ Indiana
| 
| Clarkson, Markkanen (29)
| Lauri Markkanen (11)
| Talen Horton-Tucker (7)
| Gainbridge Fieldhouse15,004
| 29–30
|-style="background:#fcc;
| 60
| February 15
| @ Memphis
| 
| Kelly Olynyk (28)
| Kessler, Olynyk (14)
| Talen Horton-Tucker (7) 
| FedEx Forum16,748
| 29–31
|-style="background:#cfc;
| 61
| February 23
| Oklahoma City
| 
| Lauri Markkanen (43)
| Walker Kessler (17)
| Clarkson, Horton-Tucker (6)
| Vivint Arena18,206
| 30–31
|-style="background:#cfc;
| 62
| February 25
| San Antonio
| 
| Lauri Markkanen (27)
| Walker Kessler (12)
| Kris Dunn (8)
| Vivint Arena18,206
| 31–31
|-style="background:#fcc;
| 63
| February 28
| San Antonio
| 
| Lauri Markkanen (28)
| Walker Kessler (15)
| Dunn, Horton-Tucker (3)
| Vivint Arena18,206
| 31–32

|-style="background:#fcc;"
| 64
| March 3
| @ Oklahoma 
| 
| Lauri Markkanen (20)
| Walker Kessler (11)
| Kris Dunn (6)
| Paycom Center16,538
| 31–33
|-style="background:#fcc;
| 65
| March 5
| @ Oklahoma
|  
| Jordan Clarkson (18)
| Kessler, Olynyk (10)
| Jordan Clarkson (12)
| Paycom Center14,778
| 31–34
|-style="background:#fcc;
| 66
| March 7
| @ Dallas 
|  
| Lauri Markkanen (33)
| Kris Dunn (8)
| Kris Dunn (5)
| American Airlines Center20,277
| 31–35
|-style="background:#cfc;
| 67
| March 9
| @ Orlando 
|  
| Lauri Markkanen (31)
| Walker Kessler (10)
| Talen Horton-Tucker (8)
| Amway Center16,552
| 32–35
|-style="background:#cfc;"
| 68
| March 11
| @ Charlotte
| 
| Talen Horton-Tucker (37)
| Walker Kessler (16)
| Talen Horton-Tucker (10)
| Spectrum Center17,221
| 33–35
|-style="background:#fcc;
| 69
| March 13
| @ Miami
| 
| Lauri Markkanen (38)
| Walker Kessler (9)
| Dunn, Horton-Tucker (8)  
| Miami-Dade Arena19,721
| 33–36
|-style="background:#cfc;
| 70
| March 18
| Boston
| 
| Lauri Markkanen (28)
| Walker Kessler (14)
| Dunn, Olynyk (6)
| Vivint Arena18,206
| 34–36
|-style="background:#;
| 71
| March 20
| Sacramento
| 
| 
| 
| 
| Vivint Arena
| 
|-style="background:#;
| 72
| March 22
| Portland
| 
| 
| 
| 
| Vivint Arena
| 
|-style="background:#;
| 73
| March 24
| Milwaukee
| 
| 
| 
| 
| Vivint Arena
| 
|-style="background:#;
| 74
| March 25
| @ Sacramento
| 
| 
| 
| 
| Golden 1 Center
| 
|-style="background:#;
| 75
| March 27
| @ Phoenix
| 
| 
| 
| 
| Vivint Arena
| 
|-style="background:#;
| 76
| March 29
| @ San Antonio
| 
| 
| 
| 
| AT&T Center
| 
|-style="background:#;
| 77 
| March 31
| @ Boston
| 
| 
| 
| 
| TD Garden
| 

|-style="background:#;
| 78
| April 2
| 
| 
| 
| 
| 
| 
| 
|-style="background:#;
| 79
| April 4
| 
| 
| 
| 
| 
| 
| 
|-style="background:#;
| 80
| April 6
| 
| 
| 
| 
| 
| 
| 
|-style="background:#;
| 81
| April 8
| 
| 
| 
| 
| 
| 
| 
|-style="background:#;
| 82 
| April 9
| 
| 
| 
| 
| 
| 
|

Transactions

Trades

Free agency

Additions

Subtractions

References 

Utah Jazz seasons
Utah Jazz
Utah Jazz
Utah Jazz